Hedges–Robinson–Myers House is a historic home and farm complex located near Hedgesville, Berkeley County, West Virginia. The main section of the house is a two-story, four bay, gable roofed section with weatherboard added about 1880 in the Gothic Revival style. The western section of the log house was built about 1750.  Also on the property is a bank barn (1850), ice house, stone smokehouse, slave quarters, corn crib, and spring and dairy house.

It was listed on the National Register of Historic Places in 1994.

References

Houses on the National Register of Historic Places in West Virginia
Farms on the National Register of Historic Places in West Virginia
Gothic Revival architecture in West Virginia
Houses completed in 1880
Houses in Berkeley County, West Virginia
National Register of Historic Places in Berkeley County, West Virginia
Slave cabins and quarters in the United States